Raza Haider  was a Pakistani politician who served as a member of the Provincial Assembly of Sindh. He was killed by target killers in 2010.

See also
 Syed Manzar Imam

References

2010 deaths
Year of birth missing
Muttahida Qaumi Movement politicians
Targeted killings in Pakistan
Politicians from Karachi
People murdered in Karachi
Assassinated Pakistani politicians
Deaths by firearm in Sindh
Sindh MPAs 2008–2013